Paul Richard Nevin (born 23 June 1969) is a football coach and former player. He is a first team coach at Premier League club West Ham United.

Playing career
Nevin began his playing career at Shrewsbury Town, before playing college soccer whilst studying at the University of Evansville in the United States. In 1991, Nevin returned to England, making eight Football League appearances for Carlisle United as the club finished bottom of the Football League. Following his spell at Carlisle, Nevin joined Yeovil Town for two seasons maing 48 appearances in all competitions, before retiring from football at the age of 24 due to injury.

Coaching career
Nevin began his coaching career at Fulham in the United Kingdom where he spent eight years in several roles including academy and reserve team Manager. He then accepted an invitation to improve the fortunes of the struggling New Zealand Knights who competed in the Australian Hyundai A League. Nevin was appointed manager with the departure of former coach John Adshead at the completion of the 2005–06 A-League season.

Following his tenure in New Zealand, Nevin then took up a position at Aspire Academy in Qatar in 2007. He was responsible for developing players for Qatar's junior and senior national teams, while also being involved in coach development. Nevin has coached in Africa, China and Brazil and was also a regular guest presenter on the Al Jazeera Sports Channel.

Following a successful five years in the Middle East, Nevin returned to the Premier League as head of coaching at Norwich City. This spell at the club also saw him promoted to the role of First Team Coach. In 2014, Nevin was approached by the Premier League to become head of academy coach development, a role that saw Nevin work with all the Premier League and Category One clubs and support each of them with their Coach Development programmes. Nevin has also worked with the FA as a coach with the youth national teams.

In October 2018, Nevin was temporarily appointed to Gareth Southgate's England national team coaching staff as part of the FA's BAME coaching initiative across all national teams. Nevin remained with the Three Lions through to their third-place finish at the 2019 UEFA Nations League Finals.

In February 2020, Nevin was appointed as first team coach at West Ham United.

On 31 August 2021, it was confirmed that Nevin had returned to the England coaching staff alongside his West Ham duties.

Honours
England
UEFA Nations League third place: 2019

References

Living people
1969 births
English footballers
Footballers from Lewisham
Association football forwards
Evansville Purple Aces men's soccer players
English Football League players
Shrewsbury Town F.C. players
Carlisle United F.C. players
Yeovil Town F.C. players
English football managers
Association football coaches
A-League Men managers
Aspire Academy managers
Fulham F.C. non-playing staff
Norwich City F.C. non-playing staff
West Ham United F.C. non-playing staff
English expatriate footballers
English expatriate sportspeople in the United States
English expatriate sportspeople in New Zealand
English expatriate sportspeople in Qatar